Chhinnamasta Devi Temple (Odia:ଛିନ୍ନମସ୍ତା ଦେବୀ ମନ୍ଦିର ; also called as Biswanahakani Temple) is a Shakti Pitha of Goddess Kali located at Haladibasanta village, Tangi block of Cuttack District in Odisha, India.

This type of temple is very rare in India. The roadway of this temple is directly connected to NH5 via Tangi Village of Cuttack District. It is surrounded by mountains and jungles.

Location of the place 

It is 20 km north to Cuttack besides National Highway (NH 5) and South Eastern Railway and 10 km away from NH towards west from Tangi and also 40 km away from state capital Bhubaneswar in the same NH 5. The nearest bus stop is at Tangi chhak(4 km) and very near to the Driems Engineering college. The nearest airport is Biju Patnaik Airport in Bhubaneswar. This is near the industrial town Choudwar.

Nearest railway stations
1. Tangi Railway station: This is a small station and only few passenger trains halt here.
2. Nirgundi Station: This is a small station and only few passenger trains halt here.
3. Cuttack Station: All major trains stop here which is around 15 km away.
4. Bhubaneswar Station: All major trains stop here which is around 44 km away.

Other Chinnamasta temples in Odisha 

Chinnamasta Kali Temple
Address: Jobra Colony, Cuttack, Odisha 753003

Manikeswari is also believed to be another Chhinnamasta temple in Odisha
https://en.wikipedia.org/wiki/Manikeswari

Adjacent historical places 

Mahavinayak Temple: Mahavinayak temple is a major center of pilgrimage and one of the oldest Ganesha temples in Odisha. This is around 30 km away from this place.

Lalitgiri, Ratnagiri & Udayagiri: The three Boudh Vihars are at a distance of 70 km from Cuttack. The famous Buddhist Complex is said to be ancient seat of Puspagiri, the buddhist university of the 7th century A.D. Recently a statue of emperor Ashok is being discovered form Langudi hill.

Gokarneswara Temple: This Shiva temple is situated in Jaraka which is just 35  km away from Tangi on the bank of river Bramhani.

Biraja Temple: This temple was built in the 13th century. As per the name of Goddess Biraja this place is also known as Biraja Peetha.  It is situated in the Jajpur town which is nearly 60 km from Tangi.

Chatia Bata Temple: This temple is another famous temple of Lord Jagganath on NH 5. It is around 10 km from Tangi and 25 km from Cuttack. Every day, many pilgrims from Orissa and nearby states visit.

Shakti Peethas
Cuttack district
Hindu temples in Khordha district

External links

 Odisha Tourism

Hindu temples in Cuttack
Shakti temples